David Bloor (born 1942) is a British sociologist. He is a professor in, and a former director of, the Science Studies Unit at the University of Edinburgh. He is a key figure in the Edinburgh school and played a major role in the development of the field of science and technology studies. He is best known for advocating the strong programme in the sociology of scientific knowledge, most notably in his book Knowledge and Social Imagery.

Biography

He was born in Derby. He started his academic career in philosophy and psychology. In 1972 he was awarded a PhD by the University of Edinburgh for his thesis "Speech and the regulation of behaviour." In the 1970s he and Barry Barnes were the major figures of the strong programme, which put forward queries against philosophical a priorism in the understanding of scientific knowledge. This is an approach, popular in the philosophy of science, that simply precluded inquiries about science by treating successful scientific knowledge as simply true or rational without empirically investigating how such knowledge has come to be accepted as true or rational. Bloor's book Knowledge and Social Imagery (Routledge, 1976) is one of the key texts of the strong programme.

Bloor wrote extensively on the Kuhn/Popper debate, and is a representative figure of the sociology of scientific knowledge. In the 1980s when French scholars like Bruno Latour developed the actor-network theory (partially based on the strong programme), David Bloor strongly disagreed with the ANT camp when they argued that human and non-humans should be treated in an equivalent manner, going so far as to write an article entitled "Anti-Latour".

He was awarded the John Desmond Bernal Prize by the Society for Social Studies of Science in 1996 in recognition of his distinguished contribution to the field.

Publications

Books

Selected articles

References

External links 
 David Bloor's home page at the University of Edinburgh.
 Science Technology and Innovation Studies, University of Edinburgh

Living people
British sociologists
Sociologists of science
Philosophers of science
1942 births
Alumni of the University of Edinburgh
Academics of the University of Edinburgh
People from Derby